Federal Route 70, or Jalan Kampar-Changkat Jong, is a federal road in Perak, Malaysia. The road connects Kampar in the north to Changkat Jong in the south.

Route background 
The Kilometre Zero of the Federal Route 70 starts at Kampar, at its interchange with the Federal Route 1, the main trunk road of the central of Peninsular Malaysia.

Features

At most sections, the Federal Route 70 was built under the JKR R5 road standard, with a speed limit of 90 km/h.

List of junctions and town

References

Malaysian Federal Roads